This is a list of the Austria national football team results from 1960 to 1979.

1960

1961

1962

1963

1964

1965

1966

1967

1968

1969

1970

1971

1972

1973

1974

1975

1976

1977

1978

1979

Appearances and goals

External links
Results at RSSSF 
Details at EU Football.net

1960s in Austria
1970s in Austria
Austria national football team results